This is the list of real estate properties owned by ABS-CBN Corporation, a Philippine media and entertainment conglomerate based in Quezon City.

Real estate properties

Current
ABS-CBN Broadcasting Center (headquarters; located in Diliman, Quezon City, Metro Manila)
Dolphy Theater (formerly known as Studio 1, ABS-CBN's only theater on ABS-CBN Studios)
ABS-CBN JUSMAG Compound (used by production divisions)
ABS-CBN Main Building (headquarters; used by ABS-CBN News and Current Affairs, ABS-CBN Radio, and ABS-CBN Entertainment)
ABS-CBN Studios (studios and production facilities; used by ABS-CBN Entertainment and ABS-CBN News)

Pinoy Big Brother House, Performance Area and Dormitory (located on the outskirts of ABS-CBN Broadcast Center)
Gina Lopez Building (also known as ABS-CBN Foundation Building; offices of the company's foundation)
ABS-CBN Audience Entrance (used for audience accommodations)
ELJ Communication Center (PEZA IT Center; head office and corporate headquarters; located inside ABS-CBN Broadcast Center Compound)
The Development and Talent Center or DTC Building (offices and studios; used by ABS-CBN's talent management, Star Magic and divisions)

ABS-CBN Vertis Tent (used for entertainment purposes and bazaar; located inside Ayala Malls Vertis North)
ABS-CBN Regional Properties and Offices (regional office scattered across the Philippines, used by ABS-CBN Regional commonly for news purposes and to broadcast local and national shows; currently unused but still owned by the company)
Horizon IT Park (also known as ABS-CBN Soundstage and PEZA IT Park; under construction), located in Igay Road, Barangay Sto. Cristo, San Jose del Monte City, Bulacan.
Millennium Transmitter (main television transmitter; operated by Advanced Media Broadcasting System while its ownership remains with the media conglomerate)

References

External links
www.abs-cbn.com
corporate.abs-cbn.com

Real estate properties
ABS-CBN
 
ABS-CBN